The Dialogue of Athanasius and Zacchaeus is a 4th-century Greek Christian text giving a dialogue, akin to that of Dialogue with Trypho, between Athanasius, a Christian, and Zacchaeus, a Jew. Patrick Andrist and other scholars consider the work, however much it may have a base in real encounters, is primarily a missionary catechism.

F. C. Conybeare proposed the hypothesis (1898) that two later traditions, the Dialogue of Athanasius and Zacchaeus (Greek, 4th century) and the Dialogue of Timothy and Aquila (Greek, 6th century), were based on an earlier text, and identified that text as related to the lost Dialogue of Jason and Papiscus. His thesis was not widely accepted.

References

External links
A digitalized copy of "The Dialogues of Athanasius and Zacchaeus and of Timothy and Aquila" by F. C. Conybeare 1898 at the Internet Archive
Andrist Patrick, Le Dialogue d’Athanase et Zachée. Étude des sources et du contexte littéraire, Diss. of the Université de Genève, July 2001. Available on the Internet

4th-century books
4th-century Christian texts
Books on Christian missions
Christian apologetic works
Jewish apologetics
Jewish–Christian debate
Texts in Koine Greek